Fisher is an unincorporated community in rural Lincoln County, Oregon, United States. It is slightly north of the Lincoln–Lane county line in the Siuslaw National Forest. Route 34 runs along the Alsea River between Alsea and Waldport.

Fisher School Bridge crosses Five Rivers at Fisher. The bridge takes its name from Fisher Elementary School across Crab Creek Road, today a residence. Alternatively, the bridge is sometimes called Five Rivers Bridge and Fisher Covered Bridge. 
A post office named Fisher was established in this area (44.293015, -123.844390) in 1892 and closed in 1942. Martin Johanson was the first postmaster. A general mercantile store operated in Fisher, along the road near the mouth of Crab Creek.  The building stood until road improvements widened the right of way.

Name
Fisher was named for the fisher (Martes pennanti), a cat-sized animal in the same family as the weasel, badger, otter, and mink. Once much more common in the virgin forests of the Oregon Coast Range, it was driven to near extinction in these mid-elevation mountains by habitat destruction, trapping, and poison baits meant to kill coyotes and wolves.  The animals are still sighted rarely in the immediate area.

References

Unincorporated communities in Lincoln County, Oregon
Alsea River
Siuslaw National Forest
Unincorporated communities in Oregon